Redshaw is a surname of Northern English origin. Notable people with the surname include:

Barbara Redshaw, South African lawn and indoor bowler
Jack Redshaw (born 1990), British footballer
Leonard Redshaw (1911–1989), British shipbuilder 
Mark Redshaw (born 1984), British footballer
Mike Redshaw, South African lawn and indoor bowler
Ray Redshaw (born 1958), British footballer

References

Surnames of English origin